Ahmad Karim Kundi is a Pakistani politician who had been a member of the Provincial Assembly of Khyber Pakhtunkhwa from August 2018 till January 2023.

Political career

He was elected to the Provincial Assembly of Khyber Pakhtunkhwa as a candidate of Pakistan Peoples Party from Constituency PK-96 (Dera Ismail Khan-II) in 2018 Pakistani general election.

References

Living people
Pakistan People's Party
Year of birth missing (living people)